Jagdev Singh (born 1931) is an Indian hurdler. He competed in the men's 400 metres hurdles at the 1956 Summer Olympics.

References

External links
 

1931 births
Possibly living people
Athletes (track and field) at the 1956 Summer Olympics
Athletes (track and field) at the 1958 British Empire and Commonwealth Games
Indian male hurdlers
Olympic athletes of India
Place of birth missing (living people)
Commonwealth Games competitors for India
20th-century Indian people